SB1, SB 1, SB.1, SB-1, or SB>1 may refer to:

 SB1, a single-lined spectroscopic binary star
 SB1, the Sabino 1 coat color pattern gene found in some, but not all varieties of Sabino horses
 SB1, a shorthand designation of Soldier Boy I, a fictional superhero in the The Boys franchise
 Senate Bill 1, a 2006 California legislative bill which expands the role of the California Solar Initiative
 Senate Bill 1, Road Repair and Accountability Act, a 2017 California legislative bill
 Tupolev SB-1, another name for the Tupolev SB, a 1930s Russian bomber
 Short SB.1, a 1951 British experimental tailless glider
 Sikorsky/Boeing SB-1 Defiant, also SB>1, an American experimental compound helicopter
 Stinson SB-1 Detroiter, a 1921 American utility aircraft
 Loessl Sb.1 Münchener Eindekker, a 1921 German experimental glider